Top Country Albums is a chart that ranks the top-performing country music albums in the United States, published by Billboard.  Chart positions are based on multi-metric consumption, blending traditional album sales, track equivalent albums, and streaming equivalent albums.

In the issue of Billboard dated January 1, Taylor Swift was at number one with Red (Taylor's Version), which retained its place atop the chart from the previous week.  Two weeks later, it was replaced by Dangerous: The Double Album by Morgan Wallen, which returned to number one having already spent 39 weeks in the top spot in 2021. The album remained at number one for 20 consecutive weeks, during which it broke the record for the highest number of weeks spent at number one on the Top Country Albums chart, which had previously stood at 50.  

Wallen's album was replaced at number one by American Heartbreak by Zach Bryan in the issue dated June 4, 2022.  It was the first number one for Bryan; the album also topped Billboards Top Rock Albums chart.  Wallen's album returned to the peak position the following week and spent four weeks atop the chart before being displaced by Growin' Up by Luke Combs in the issue dated July 9.  Growin' Up spent only a single week in the top spot, in contrast to the singer's previous album, 2019's What You See Is What You Get, which spent 37 weeks at number one.  Wallen's album once again returned to number one the following week and as of the issue dated December 31 had spent a total of 88 weeks atop the chart.

Chart history

See also
2022 in country music
List of Billboard number-one country songs of 2022

References

2022
United States Country Albums